Handsome Devil may refer to:

 Handsome Devil (band), a punk band from California
 Handsome Devil (album), a 2004 album by Jim Bianco
 Handsome Devil (film), a 2016 Irish film
 "Handsome Devil", a song by The Smiths, from the album Hatful of Hollow

See also
 That Handsome Devil, a rock band from Massachusetts